The 2020–21 Raków Częstochowa season was the club's 2nd consecutive season in Ekstraklasa. In addition to the domestic league, Raków participated in this season's edition of the Polish Cup.

The club qualified for the following seasons' editions of the UEFA Europa Conference League and the Polish SuperCup.

Players

Competitions

Ekstraklasa

Standings

Matches

Polish Cup

Road to the final

Final

Final squad

Notes

References

Raków Częstochowa
Raków Częstochowa